Distortion is the eighth studio album by American indie pop band The Magnetic Fields. It was released on January 15, 2008 on Nonesuch Records.

Recording 

As the album's title implies, several of the musical performances featured are distorted by various means. In particular, the album's sound was influenced by the 1985 album Psychocandy by The Jesus and Mary Chain.

Distortion was recorded at Mother West in New York City. It was produced by Stephin Merritt and co-produced by Charles Newman.

No synthesizers were used to record the album; it is the second in a "no-synth trilogy", succeeding the 2004 album i and preceding 2010's Realism.

Release 

Distortion debuted at number 77 on the U.S. Billboard 200 chart, selling about 8,000 copies in its first week.

Reception 

Distortion has been well received by critics. It currently holds a 79/100 rating at review aggregator website Metacritic.

Track listing

Personnel

The Magnetic Fields 

 Stephin Merritt – vocals, instrumentation, production, mixing
 Claudia Gonson – drums, piano, Farfisa organ, backing vocals, management
 Sam Davol – cello
 John Woo – lead guitar
 Shirley Simms – vocals

Additional personnel 

 Daniel Handler – accordion
 A. Klasinski, I. Pearle, R. Stevens – "orgiasts"

Technical 

 Charles Newman – production, mixing
 Tom Rogers – mixing, additional mastering
 Robert Stevens – engineering assistance
 Jeff Lipton – mastering
 Evan Gaffney Design – sleeve design
 Marcelo Krasilcic – sleeve photography
 Michael English – logo design

References

External links 

 

2008 albums
Nonesuch Records albums
The Magnetic Fields albums